WeeChat (Wee Enhanced Environment for Chat) is a free and open-source Internet Relay Chat client that is designed to be light and fast. It is released under the terms of the GNU GPL-3.0-or-later and has been developed since 2003.

WeeChat comes with a default ncurses interface, and it is possible to use other interfaces (e.g. Glowing Bear, a web frontend) through the use of the relay plugin.

Features
WeeChat's features include:
 IPv6
 SSL
 Proxy connections
 The screen can be split up to display multiple windows at the same time.
 Incremental text search
 Aspell support for spell checking
 Scripting support for many languages (Perl, Python, Ruby, Lua, Tcl, Scheme with GNU Guile, JavaScript with V8 (JavaScript engine), PHP)
 FIFO pipes for remote control
 Support for multiple character encodings
 User-defined aliases and shortkeys

Supported platforms
WeeChat supports most platforms and operating systems, including Linux, BSD, macOS, Debian GNU/Hurd, HP-UX, Solaris, QNX, Haiku, and Microsoft Windows (via the Cygwin library and API).

Binary packages and builds of WeeChat are available for installation as well as the source code for self compilation. This includes most Linux distributions and BSD package management systems, such as Debian, Ubuntu, Mandriva Linux, Fedora, Gentoo Linux, Arch Linux, FreeBSD via the FreeBSD Ports system, OpenBSD via the Ports collection, as well on NetBSD via Pkgsrc.

Reception
In his review for Free Software Magazine, Martin Brown graded WeeChat with 43 points out of a possible 50, noting that "At first glance, WeeChat is not as friendly or easy to use as Rhapsody", but, "There’s a lot of hidden power built into the application", including Python, Perl, Ruby and Lua extensions which can be selected at installation.

See also

 Comparison of Internet Relay Chat clients
 List of Internet Relay Chat commands
 irssi

References

External links

 

Internet Relay Chat clients
Free Internet Relay Chat clients
MacOS Internet Relay Chat clients
Unix Internet Relay Chat clients
Windows Internet Relay Chat clients
Free software programmed in C
Cross-platform software
Lua (programming language)-scriptable software
Software that uses ncurses